Robert John Fogelin (June 24, 1932– October 24, 2016) was an American philosopher, and advocate and leading scholar of modern Pyrrhonism. He was a professor of philosophy and Sherman Fairchild Professor in the humanities (emeritus) at Dartmouth College where he had taught since 1980. He was elected a fellow of the American Academy of Arts and Sciences in 2005.

Education and career
Fogelin received his B.A. from the University of Rochester in 1955. In 1957 he received his M.A. from Yale University and in 1960 his Ph.D. also from Yale. He joined the faculty of Pomona College in 1958. In 1966, he became an associate professor at Yale. He served as master of Yale's Trumbull College from 1973 to 1976. Fogelin remained at Yale until 1980 when he became a professor at Dartmouth. 

Fogelin died on October 24, 2016, after struggling with Parkinson's disease.

Selected publications 
 Fogelin, Robert J. (1994) Pyrrhonian Reflections on Knowledge and Justification, Oxford: Oxford University Press
 Fogelin, Robert J. (2003) Walking the Tightrope of Reason: The Precarious Life of a Rational Animal, Oxford: Oxford University Press
 Fogelin, Robert J. (1987) Wittgenstein. 2nd ed. The Arguments of Philosophers, London: Routledge and Kegan Paul
 Fogelin, Robert J. (2009) Taking Wittgenstein at His Word, Princeton, Princeton University Press
 Fogelin, Robert J. (2003) A Defense of Hume on Miracles, Princeton, Princeton University Press (part of the Princeton Monographs in Philosophy)
 Fogelin, Robert J. (2009) Hume's Skeptical Crisis: A Textual Study, Oxford: Oxford University Press
 Fogelin, Robert J. (1985) Hume's Skepticism in the Treatise of Human Nature. London: Routledge and Kegan Paul
 Fogelin, Robert J. (1992) Philosophical Interpretations. New York: Oxford University Press
 Fogelin, Robert J. (1988) Figuratively Speaking, New Haven, Yale University Press
 Sinnott-Armstrong, Walter and Fogelin, Robert J. (2009) Understanding Arguments: An Introduction to Informal Logic, Wadsworth Publishing

References 

1932 births
2016 deaths
American philosophers
Dartmouth College faculty
Fellows of the American Academy of Arts and Sciences
Pomona College faculty
University of Rochester alumni
Yale University alumni
Yale University faculty